"I Want You to Want Me" is a song recorded by British-American girl group Solid HarmoniE, released in 1998 as the second single from their only album, Solid HarmoniE (1997). It was produced by Swedish producers Kristian Lundin and Max Martin, who also co-wrote it, and peaked within the top 10 in Finland, the Netherlands and Sweden. Additionally, it was a top 20 hit in Denmark, Norway, Scotland and the UK. On the Eurochart Hot 100, it reached number 23 in April 1998. A music video was produced to promote the single, directed by Roger Pomphrey.

Critical reception
British Birmingham Evening Mail wrote, "More top pop sounds from the four girl group should see them holding their own despite all the competition around these days." Can't Stop the Pop complimented the hooks of the song as "unmistakeably Max Martin through and through." They added that the "glorious pre-chorus (“We’ve got to stop this game, tell me do you feel the same?”) is arguably the highlight of the song. It’s an effortless snapshot of pop music at its most uplifting and sunniest". An editor from Sunday Mirror described it as "gnawingly good pop which should have you all on solids by the end of the week."

Track listing
 12" single, Italy
"I Want You to Want Me" (Original Radio Edit) – 3:28
"I Want You to Want Me" (Original Extended) – 5:01
"I Want You to Want Me" (Barbarus Club Remix) – 6:57
"I Want You to Want Me" (Colour System Inc. Remix) – 6:10
"I Want You to Want Me" (Kay Cee Remix) – 5:59

 CD single, Europe
"I Want You to Want Me" (Original Radio Version) – 3:28
"I Want You to Want Me" (Original Extended Version) – 5:01

 CD maxi, Europe
"I Want You to Want Me" (Original Radio Version) – 3:28
"I Want You to Want Me" (Original Extended Version) – 5:01
"I Want You to Want Me" (Barbarus Remix) – 6:57
"I Want You to Want Me" (Colour System Inc. Remix) – 6:10
"I Want You to Want Me" (Kay Cee Remix) – 5:59
"I Want You to Want Me" (Colour System Dub) – 7:09

Charts

Weekly charts

Year-end charts

References

1998 singles
1998 songs
Solid HarmoniE songs
Jive Records singles
Songs written by Max Martin
Song recordings produced by Max Martin